Kłodnica is a river in the Upper Silesia region. It is about 75 km long and a right tributary of the Odra river.

Along Kłodnica's shore are Polish cities of Katowice, Kędzierzyn-Koźle, Ruda Śląska, Gliwice, and Zabrze.

There was also a Kłodnica Canal that opened in 1806. This water transport facility has been replaced by the Gliwice Canal.

Rivers of Poland
Rivers of Silesian Voivodeship